Ovidiu Mendizov (Russian: Овидиу Мендизов; born 9 August 1986 in Romania) is a Romanian footballer.

References

Romanian footballers
Living people
Association football defenders
Association football wingers
Association football midfielders
FC Milsami Orhei players
FC Precizia Săcele players
FC Brașov (1936) players
FC Petrolul Ploiești players
FC Okzhetpes players
CSM Corona Brașov footballers
FC Zimbru Chișinău players
Kramfors-Alliansen Fotboll players
1986 births